Gym floor covers can either be a carpet-based protection system or a large plastic tarp, similar to a painters tarp, usually divided into equal sections  wide each to cover up the entire gym floor. Gym floor covers are available in roll or tile systems. These covers are often used in large venues designed for athletic events when non-athletic events are being held there such as receptions, award ceremonies, indoor track meets, gymnastic events and graduations.

History
Gym floor covers are employed to prevent floor damage and improve safety, allowing for sports venues to be used for other purposes. Covers are used to prevent slip and fall accidents, while protecting underlying hardwood floors from foot traffic damage and heavy furniture scratches and dents. The newer carpet topcloth systems also improve acoustics in the gymnasium.

The first plastic tarp gym floor cover was invented and manufactured by Covermaster Inc. in 1969. The best plastic tarp gym floor covers today are made of single-layer woven polyester and the newest polymer materials made via the knife-coating process, which enables dyes to be deposited deep into the core of the PVC material and prevent peeling of the layers - a side effect of extrusion coating or lamination process.

Custom sizing is available with most products. The following technical characteristics are used to describe and classify the covers: filament size, weave count, total weight, core weight, tear strength, tensile strength, adhesion, coefficient of friction, slip resistance, hydrostatic resistance, fire resistance and others.

Usage

There are several common ways to install floor coverings. For the tarp method, each section is laid down to slightly overlap adjacent sections and then secured with special adhesive tape. This fastens the individual segments together into a cohesive unit. The carpet method, by contrast, affixes the segments to the floor via reusable velcro straps. Newer tile systems allow more flexibility in installation and do not require adhesive or velcro tape, but are much more labor intensive for larger floors.

Installing and deploying large covers can be a labor-intensive task. The most efficient way involves rolling and unrolling each section separately, and storing them on the gym floor cover storage system (rack) in a rolled up state to prevent creases and dust accumulation. Advances in the newer Protex GymPro products allow for smaller storage racks, while the newer tile systems are stacked on compact platform trucks for storage and transport. Dual cleaning brush assemblies (to remove debris) and electric power winders (to reduce manual labor during cover removal) are normally used to efficiently maintain the covers. Carpet based gym covers are best cleaned using more traditional carpet cleaning techniques.

Plastic tarp gym floor covers have a typical lifetime of 10–15 years. Carpet-based covers have a lifetime of 15–20+ years.

References

See also
 Gym
 Flooring
 Plastic
 Physical Education

Floors
Sports equipment